¿Quién mató a Patricia Soler? is a 2015 Spanish-language telenovela produced by RTI Producciones for Colombia-based television network RCN Televisión. The program is fifth in a series of remakes of the 1981 Chilean telenovela La madrastra.

Plot 
17 years ago a group of friends, partners of a jeweler's emporium, traveled on business to New York. One night, Sara Fernández, wife of Sebastián Sinisterra, president of the company is surprised with the body of Patricia Soler with the revolver in her hands. She is brought to trial, where one of Sebastian's partners, Samuel, who is in love with Sara, testifies against her for not responding to his feelings, causing her to be sentenced to life imprisonment.

In prison, Sara, transformed into a tough woman, has a unique hobby to make beautiful pieces of silver jewelry, art that passes to her cellmate, who ends up telling her story. Because of her sentence, Sara loses custody of her two young children, Lucia and Camilo, and suffers terribly from the injustice committed by Sebastian, who divorced her and left her to rot in jail forever. Now the only thoughts that motivate Sara's life are: to obtain her freedom, recover her children and unmask Patricia's real killer to finally do justice.

Meanwhile, Sebastian and the rest of the partners continue with their lives. Joaquín and Florencia have managed to have a good status while Ricardo and Daniela, losing their fortune on bad investments, Ricardo tries to marry his niece Silvia to Sebastian in order to recover the lost wealth. Samuel never regrets having lied against Sara, while Alba and Carmen, Sebastian's aunts, maintain their stock in the company and their leadership in the house. Also, his children Camilo and Lucia, along with Diego (son of Patricia) and Rodrigo (Younger son of Carmen), have joined the management of the jeweler's emporium.

After a pardon is obtained by Sara's lawyer, Sara finally obtains her freedom and returns to the country seeking to recover her dignity and do justice to Patricia's death. As the story progresses, suspects are discarded and there are only three people left who went on that trip and could be the probable murderers. Finally, Sara discovers who really killed Patricia and in the final confrontation with the killer, she is about to die, but Sebastian saves her by delivering the real murderer to the authorities to pay for all the crimes that were committed.

Cast 
 Géraldine Zivic - Patricia Soler
 Itatí Cantoral - Sara Fernández "Isabel"
 Miguel de Miguel - Sebastián Sinisterra
 Juan de Dios Ortíz - Ricardo Sotomayor
 Kristina Lilley - Alba Sinisterra
 Natalia Ramírez - Carmen Sinisterra
 Juan Pablo Franco - Samuel Gutiérrez
 Ricardo Vélez - Joaquín Delgado
 Andrea López - Florencia Ríos
 Paula Barreto - Daniela Contreras
 César Mora - Da Vinci
 Carlos Hurtado - El Pulpo
 Sandra Itzel - Lucía Sinisterra
 Luz Stella Luengas - Ángela
 José Daniel Cristancho - Camilo Sinisterra
 Santiago Gómez - Rodrigo Gutiérrez
 Ricardo Mejía - Diego
 Juan Manuel Restrepo - Miguel Tobón
 Isabel Cristina Estrada - Angélica
 Ana Wills - Silvia
 Alejandro López - Fernando Ramírez
 Franártur Duque - Taxista
 Natalia Giraldo - Rebeca
 Margalida Castro - Madre Victoria
 Carlos Felipe Sanchez - Pablo
 Milena Ribero - Valeria
 Aldemar Correa - Carlos 
 Samuel Zuluaga - Ramón
|}

References

External links 

2015 Colombian television series debuts
2015 Colombian television series endings
RCN Televisión telenovelas
Spanish-language telenovelas
Colombian telenovelas
2015 telenovelas
Television shows set in Bogotá
Television shows set in New York City